Stanovice is a municipality and village in Karlovy Vary District in the Karlovy Vary Region of the Czech Republic. It has about 600 inhabitants.

Administrative parts
Villages of Dražov, Hlinky and Nové Stanovice are administrative parts of Stanovice.

References

Villages in Karlovy Vary District